Star Appeal (星星相吸惜) is a 2004  Chinese gay-themed science fiction film (first released for public exhibition in the United States in 2008), by Chinese film director Cui Zi'en. The film was recorded on video rather than film, using a series of long, static shots. The main characters are E.T. and his Chinese friend, Xiao Bo, and the film reveals the full-frontal nudity of both characters.

Plot
Coming alone from Mars to the Earth, ET is brought home by Xiao Bo. Xiao Bo’s girlfriend, Wenwen, does not believe that ET is an alien, while Xiao Bo’s boyfriend, Xiao Jian, is simply skeptical. However, Xiao Bo is convinced of ET’s identity. He is very attentive to ET, enthusiastically showing him what the Earth looks like. In order to distract Xiao Bo from ET, Wenwen masquerades as someone from Jupiter. Her plan doesn’t work, however, so to get revenge, Xinxin declares that she’ll have a mixed Earthling-Martian baby with ET. She brings ET home, teasing him and trying to persuade him to have a baby with her, but instead, ET ends up losing consciousness. Coming to his rescue, Xiao Bo inadvertently utters “I love you”, a phrase also used by Martians. Upon hearing this, ET recovers consciousness. ET used to survive merely on sunlight, never taking any food or drink. It is for Xiao Bo’s sake that ET tastes coffee for the first time. He gradually experiences various aspects of life on Earth, learning how to love as well as what the physical limitations of humans are. On the eve of his return to Mars, ET uses the same ultimate human way of expressing love, and makes love to Xiao Bo. Through this, he dedicates his Martian love to Xiao Bo. Not long after ET has left Earth, Xiao Bo, who was “infected” by a certain Martian quality during lovemaking, returns to where they first met, and discovers the way to Mars.

Cast
 Yu Bo... Xiao Bo
 Guifeng Wang	 ... E.T. (as Gui Feng Wang)
 Xiwen Zhang	 ... Wen Wen (as Xi Wen Zhang)
 Jian Hou	 ... Xiao Jian

See also
 List of Chinese films of 2004
 List of lesbian, gay, bisexual or transgender-related films
 List of lesbian, gay, bisexual, or transgender-related films by storyline
 Nudity in film (East Asian cinema since 1929)

References

External links
 
 Filmmaker Cui Zi'en on dGenerate Films website

2004 films
2004 independent films
2000s science fiction drama films
Chinese independent films
Chinese LGBT-related films
Chinese science fiction drama films
Films about extraterrestrial life
Films directed by Cui Zi'en
Films set in China
Gay-related films
LGBT-related science fiction drama films
2000s Mandarin-language films
Mars in film
2004 LGBT-related films